Everton is a village and civil parish in Nottinghamshire, England. Located on the A631 between Gainsborough and Bawtry, it is part of Bassetlaw district.  The parish includes the village of Harwell. The population of the civil parish at the 2011 census was 839. There are 23 grade II listed buildings in the village. 
The village is recorded in the Domesday Book of 1086–7 as Evretone. Everton was originally a Danish settlement by the name of Eofor-tun. For the majority of its history Everton's inhabitants have been farmers. Everton is twinned with the French village of Bouy in Champagne Ardenne, France.

Everton Mill was a four-storey brick tower windmill built c. 1820. It was sold along with a watermill to farmer James Taylor by Will Templence in 1848. The sails were removed in 1930, the mill being worked by steam engines installed in 1898 in a nearby engine house. The mill was still working in the 1940s but was closed c. 1950 and the machinery dismantled. The mill tower is still standing.

Holy Trinity

Holy Trinity Church, Everton was built shortly after the Norman conquest in 1066. The church went through several changes, the first being between 1150–1180 A.D., and was due to the increase in the number of worshippers. In later years gargoyles were added.

Inclosure and Drainage Act 1833 
On 24 July 1833 the Inclosure & Drainage Act was passed, which enabled the improvement of the drainage of Everton in 1860, which by this time was grossly inadequate.

Anthony Gilby 
Anthony Gilby was an MP from circa 1646 to circa 1675. He came from a lower upper class Lincolnshire family. He became wealthy after marrying a Nottinghamshire heiress. An active royalist, he joined the Newark garrison under Lord Belasyse until the signing of the articles of surrender in 1646. In 1650 he was fined £25 for being, according to the local major-general, ' a dangerous enemy '. For his collaboration in a projected rising in 1655 Anthony found himself imprisoned. By 1675 Anthony had helped pass several Parliamentary Acts and Bills. He also received the government whip. Proximally four years later he offered his services to Hull for the coming Parliament, but was turned down due to the discovery that he had embezzled £650 worth of lead and 12,000 bricks, belonging to the Hull garrison. He escaped being proceeded against, 'in consideration of his loyal and eminent services'. He was buried at Everton on 27 April 1682.

Everton's SSSI
Everton has an Site of Special Scientific Interest, that is 2 hectares.  The soil is a mixture of glacial sand with clay nodules. The developing tree layer contains trees such as oak sycamore and maple. The shrub layer includes gorse, buckthorn, privet and bramble. The ground layer has vipers bugloss, basil, thyme and thyme leaved sandwort amongst other plants.

References

External links

Village website
Twinned with Bouy, Champagne-Ardenne, France
Facebook Page : Twinned with Bouy, Champagne-Ardenne, France

Villages in Nottinghamshire
Civil parishes in Nottinghamshire
Bassetlaw District